is a Japanese actress, gravure idol, and tarento. Her real name is unpublished.

Biography, personal life
She was from Chiba on her profile, but she grew up in Chiba Prefecture and lives in Tokyo, and born in Tokyo. She is a Nihon University Law School Graduate. Her affiliated office is And M Ltd.

Aspiring to becoming an actress, she went to university and began learning acting at acting school. After that, she entered a troupe and devoted herself to acting. In 2011, she was scouted and joined her entertainment office because she appeared on TV Tokyo's Gokujō Jikara. Since then she has been active as a gravure idol for releasing DVDs, shooting sessions, variety shows and more. She was drawing attention as a sexy tarento, such as taking first place in a major mail-order site when releasing DVDs.

She is sometimes called .

Professional wrestling
She appeared at the Lucha Libre Workshop hosted by Mister Cacao, and on 17 September 2017, she was announced to make an exhibition debut at Fukumen Mania.

Appearances

Television
Gokujō Jikara (2011, TX)
10-Ri Waraeba Strike! Shinshun! Tōzai Taikō Boke Bowl (2013, KTV)
Shiseikatsu Mukidashi Variety 'Kiriuri$Idol''' (2014, Tokyo MX)Mayonaka no Obaka Sawagi! (2015–, Tokyo MX)Tokyo Audition (Kari) (2015–, Tokyo MX)Idol Pururun! Traveller (2016–, Sun TV) – MCKayo Kizuna Trendy (Chiba TV)

FilmsSeiha 3 (2015, All In Entertainment) – as Mihime ItoKeiyaku Kekkon (27 Aug 2017, Director Shinji Imaoka) – as Aki

Direct-to-videoHakui no Senshi Ultimate Angel (2016, Zen-Pictures) – as Mai Tendo/Ultimate AngelShin Heroine Kiki Ippatsu!! 11 Kurenai no Megami Wonder Freya (Aug 2017, Zen Pictures) – as Maya Mikami/Kurenai no Megami Wonder FreyaGirls Senshi Funitas –Hitsuyō Saiteigen no Gohōshi– Daiisshō (Sep 2017, Orstack Soft Hanbai) – as Bishop First Duke

MagazinesShūkan TaishūYha!Hip!&LipPhoto Technique DigitalShūkan JitsuwaFridayEX Max! SpecialStage
2011Hinatabokko – as Miho Suzuki (Protagonist)Season –Meguriai– Yamato Kikaku Performance
2012
Air Studio Juliet (Protagonist) – WWebtay chang stay challenge – as Mika (heroine)
2015
Rubber Girl Solo Live Girl+ – Guest appearance
Murako Theater 5218 Give me chocolate – as Monster, Wife

Internet television
2016
AbemaTV Peachannel regular
AbemaTV Onegai RankingRound girlKnock Out vol.1 12 Feb 2017Knock Out vol.2 1 Apr 2017Professional Shuto Kōshiki-senEvents
Reina Joshi Pro Wrestling (18 Jun, Ōji Basement Monster)

Works
DVDH na Yūwaku (30 Aug 2013, Grasso)Over Flow (29 Nov 2013, S Digital)H×holic (28 Feb 2014, Grasso)Haitoku Renai (27 Jun 2014, Grasso)Mōsō Chūdoku (31 Oct 2014, Grasso)Glamorous (27 Mar 2015, Kingdom)Dynamite (22 May 2015, Kingdom)La France (24 Jul 2015, Kingdom)Ma cherie (18 Sep 2015, Kingdom)on the Bed (27 Nov 2015, Kingdom)Cobalt Blue (8 Jan 2016, Kingdom)heat! (11 Mar 2016, Kingdom)I love you (13 May 2016, Kingdom)Sexy Honey (15 Jul 2016, Kingdom)Emerald (16 Sep 2016, Kingdom)Kindan no Rakuen (14 Oct 2016, Kingdom) – Co-starred  with Manami Sonosakifly to you (16 Dec 2016, Kingdom)Amore (17 Feb 2017, Kingdom)Venice (21 Apr 2017, Kingdom)Kachō Fūgetsu (23 Jun 2017, Kingdom)Memory of London (25 Aug 2017, Kingdom)Spicy Love (27 Oct 2017, Kingdom)Yuri no Hana Saku (24 Nov 2017, Kingdom) – Co-starred with Mio MitoSilent Night (29 Dec 2017, Kingdom)

Photo albumsAsuka Oda 1st Shashin-shū Asuka (25 Dec 2015, Saibunkan Shuppan)

Serialisations
"Sexy Banchō Asuka Oda!" (7 Apr 2017 –, Tokyo Sports'')

References

External links
 (Affiliated office's profile) 
 (Asuka Oda's blog) 

Japanese television personalities
21st-century Japanese actresses
Japanese gravure idols
Nihon University alumni
People from Chiba Prefecture
1990 births
Living people